This is a list of the NCAA outdoor champions in the pole vault event.  The women's version of the event was introduced to the program in 1998.

Champions
Key
A=Altitude assisted

 Cancelled due to the COVID-19 pandemic.

References

GBR Athletics

External links
NCAA Division I women's outdoor track and field

NCAA Women's Division I Outdoor Track and Field Championships
Outdoor track, women
Pole vault